Aldonza Alfonso de León (c. 1215–1266) was an illegitimate daughter of King Alfonso IX of León and his mistress Aldonza Martínez de Silva.

She married Pedro Ponce de Cabrera and had several children.

She is buried at the Monastery of Santa María de Nogales

References

1210s births
1266 deaths
Spanish nobility
Illegitimate children of Spanish monarchs